The Women's artistic gymnastics individual all-around competition at the 2015 European Games was held in the National Gymnastics Arena, Baku on 18 June 2015.

Qualification

The top 18 gymnasts with one per country qualified for the all-around final.

Results

References

All-around artistic gymnastics
Gymnastics at the 2015 European Games
2015 in women's gymnastics